The Spain–Portugal–Morocco 2030 FIFA World Cup bid, also known as the Iberian Bid, is a joint intended bid by Spain, Portugal and Morocco to host the 2030 FIFA World Cup. The bid was first announced by the football federations of the first two countries on 7 October 2020, with Ukraine joining on 5 October 2022. Some media have reported that there were talks to include Morocco in replacement of Ukraine, but the news was not confirmed until March 2023.

Background
Spain has previously hosted the FIFA World Cup finals in 1982, while Portugal and Morocco have never hosted the tournament. All three countries have hosted the finals of their continental tournaments once – Spain in 1964, Portugal in 2004 and Morocco in 1988. Spain and Portugal had previously submitted an unsuccessful joint bid to host the FIFA World Cup in either 2018 or 2022. FIFA's rules for rotating the tournament between continents made UEFA members, including the Royal Spanish Football Federation (RFEF) and Portuguese Football Federation (FPF) ineligible to bid for the 2026 FIFA World Cup.

The regulations for the 2030 World Cup bidding process will be announced in the second quarter of 2022, with applications being accepted from June that year and the host to be selected at the 74th FIFA Congress in 2024. If the regulations remain the same as those for the 2026 World Cup, football federations from Asia (AFC) and North America (CONCACAF) will be ineligible to host following the successful Qatar 2022 and United 2026 bids respectively. The tournament will mark the centenary of the first FIFA World Cup which was hosted by Uruguay, and several other national football federations across Europe, South America and Africa have expressed interest in bidding to host the tournament.

Announcement
The FPF and RFEF jointly announced their intentions to bid for the tournament during a goalless friendly match between the two countries' national teams on 7 October 2020. Before another goalless friendly between the two teams on 4 June 2021 (which also marked the centenary of Portugal's first international fixture, against Spain) the agreement to jointly support a bid was formalised. The respective presidents of the RFEF and FPF, Luis Rubiales and Fernando Gomes, ratified the agreement on behalf of their respective federations. Also in attendance to support the bid were King of Spain Felipe VI, President of Portugal Marcelo Rebelo de Sousa, Prime Minister of Spain Pedro Sánchez, Prime Minister of Portugal António Costa, and multiple government ministers and officials from both countries.

Addition of Ukraine as co-host 
On 5 October 2022, the FPF and RFEF held a joint press conference on their 2030 World Cup bid at the UEFA headquarters in Nyon, Switzerland. RFEF president Rubiales and FPF president Gomes were joined by Ukrainian Association of Football (UAF) president Andriy Pavelko, announcing that Ukraine would join the bid. While Ukraine's involvement in the tournament was not announced directly, it was believed that Ukraine would host a group at the tournament.

Addition of Morocco as co-host 
On 14 March 2023, King Mohammed VI of Morocco announced that the country would join the Spain–Portugal bid as a co-host. Although the Royal Spanish Football Federation did not immediately confirm the addition, the prime ministers of Spain and Portugal both welcomed Morocco's decision to join the bid.

Venues
On 14 July 2022, the Royal Spanish Football Federation unveiled a shortlist including 15 stadiums in Spain. It was decided 11 Spanish stadiums will be selected with three Portuguese ones for the Spain–Portugal 2030 FIFA World Cup bid.

 denotes stadium used for previous men's World Cup tournament (Spain only)
⋆ planned stadiums to be built

See also
Egypt–Greece–Saudi Arabia 2030 FIFA World Cup bid
Uruguay–Argentina–Chile–Paraguay 2030 FIFA World Cup bid

References

Portugal at the FIFA World Cup
Spain at the FIFA World Cup
Spain–Portugal 2030 FIFA World Cup bid
Morocco at the FIFA World Cup